William Joseph Granfield (December 18, 1889 – May 28, 1959) was a United States representative from Massachusetts.

Granfield was born in Springfield on December 18, 1889. He attended elementary and high school in Springfield, and graduated from Williston Academy in 1910.  In 1913 he received his law degree from the Notre Dame Law School.  He was admitted to the bar in 1916 and began to practice in Springfield.

He was a member of Springfield's common council in 1915 and 1916, and served in the Massachusetts House of Representatives from 1917 to 1919.  He was a delegate to the State constitutional convention of 1918 and 1919, and a delegate to the Democratic National Conventions every four years from 1924 to 1940.

He was elected as a Democrat to the Seventy-first Congress to fill the vacancy caused by the death of William K. Kaynor. He was reelected to the Seventy-second, Seventy-third, and Seventy-fourth Congresses and served from February 11, 1930 to January 3, 1937.

Granfield was not a candidate for renomination in 1936. He was appointed presiding justice of the district court of Springfield in 1936, and served until his retirement July 27, 1949.

He died in Springfield on May 28, 1959. Interment was at St. Michael’s Cemetery in Springfield.

See also
 1917 Massachusetts legislature
 1918 Massachusetts legislature
 1919 Massachusetts legislature

Sources

1889 births
1959 deaths
Massachusetts city council members
Massachusetts state court judges
Democratic Party members of the Massachusetts House of Representatives
Williston Northampton School alumni
Notre Dame Law School alumni
Massachusetts lawyers
Democratic Party members of the United States House of Representatives from Massachusetts
20th-century American judges
20th-century American politicians
20th-century American lawyers